Ben Morris a Wales international rugby league footballer who plays as a  forward for the North Wales Crusaders in RFL League 1.

Background
Ben Morris was born in Liverpool, Merseyside, England, he has Welsh  ancestors, and eligible to play for Wales  due to the grandparent rule.

Playing career
Morris joined St Helens when he was 14. In 2016 he was part of their unbeaten Academy side. For 2017, he signed a 12-month contract with the Super League squad.

He made his début for Wales in the 2017 Rugby League World Cup qualifiers, scoring two tries against Italy.

He has spent time on loan at Oldham RLFC (Heritage № 1382), Sheffield Eagles, Keighley Cougars and Workington Town

North Wales Crusaders
On 31 Aug 2020 it was reported that he had signed for North Wales Crusaders in the RFL League 1

References

External links
St Helens profile
Statistics at rugby-league.com
(archived by web.archive.org) Statistics at rlwc2017.com

1997 births
Living people
English rugby league players
Keighley Cougars players
North Wales Crusaders players
Oldham R.L.F.C. players
Rochdale Hornets players
Rugby league centres
Rugby league players from Liverpool
Rugby league second-rows
Sheffield Eagles players
St Helens R.F.C. players
Swinton Lions players
Wales national rugby league team players
Workington Town players